Felipe Fernandes Sousa (born 6 May 1999) is a Brazilian footballer who plays as a forward for Gama.

Career statistics

Club

Notes

References

1999 births
Living people
Brazilian footballers
Association football forwards
Campeonato Brasileiro Série D players
União Recreativa dos Trabalhadores players
Esporte Clube XV de Novembro (Piracicaba) players
Clube Atlético Mineiro players
Sociedade Esportiva do Gama players